Little Buade Lake is a freshwater body of the unorganized territory of Lac-Ashuapmushuan, Quebec in the western part of the Regional County Municipality (MRC) Le Domaine-du-Roy, in the Saguenay-Lac-Saint-Jean administrative region, in the province of Quebec, in Canada.

This lake straddles the townships of Buade and Ventadour.

Forestry is the main economic activity of the sector, followed by recreational tourism activities.
 
The forest road route 212 connecting Obedjiwan, Quebec and La Tuque passes south of Dubois Lake and Buade Lake (Normandin River). Other secondary forest roads serve the vicinity of the lake.

The surface of Little Buade Lake is usually frozen from early November to mid-May, but safe ice circulation is generally from mid-November to mid-April.

Geography

Toponymy
The toponym "Petit Lac Buade" (English: Little Buade Lake) was formalized on December 5, 1968, by the Commission de toponymie du Québec, i.e. at the creation of this commission.

Notes and references

See also 

Lakes of Saguenay–Lac-Saint-Jean
Le Domaine-du-Roy Regional County Municipality